James Henry Woodget (28 September 1874 – 3 October 1960) was a British tug of war competitor who competed in the 1908 Summer Olympics. In 1908 he won the bronze medal as member of the British team Metropolitan Police "K" Division.

References

External links
profile

1874 births
1960 deaths
Metropolitan Police officers
Olympic tug of war competitors of Great Britain
Tug of war competitors at the 1908 Summer Olympics
Olympic bronze medallists for Great Britain
Olympic medalists in tug of war
Medalists at the 1908 Summer Olympics